The 2017 Men's Pan-American Volleyball Cup was the twelfth edition of the annual Men's Pan-American volleyball tournament. It was held in Gatineau, Quebec, Canada, from 25 July to 30 July. Eight teams competed in the tournament. Argentina won the tournament for the first time, Puerto Rico and Cuban won Silver and Bronze. Argentinian Martín Ramos was selected Most Valuable Player.

Competing nations

Competition format
The competition format for the 2017 Pan American Volleyball Cup divides the eight participating teams in 2 groups of 4 teams each.

The best team from Group A and Group B will advance to the semifinals, the second and third teams from Group B will play the quarterfinals against the second and third teams from Pool A.

Pool standing procedure
Match won 3–0: 5 points for the winner, 0 point for the loser
Match won 3–1: 4 points for the winner, 1 points for the loser
Match won 3–2: 3 points for the winner, 2 points for the loser
In case of tie, the teams were classified according to the following criteria:
points ratio and sets ratio

Preliminary round
All times are in Eastern Daylight Time (UTC−04:00)

Group A

|}

Group B

Final round

Championship bracket

Quarterfinals

5th–8th classification

Semifinals

7th place match

|}

5th place match

|}

Bronze medal match

Final

Final standing

Individual awards

Most Valuable Player
  Martín Ramos
Best Setter
  Edgardo Goás
Best Outside Hitters
  Miguel Ángel López
  Wilfrido Hernández
Best Middle Blockers
  Mitchell Stahl
  Pablo Crer
Best Opposite
  José Miguel Cáceres
Best Scorer
  Emerson Rodríguez
Best Server
  Edson Valencia
Best Libero
  Héctor Mata
Best Digger
  Héctor Mata
Best Receiver
  Héctor Mata

References

Men's Pan-American Volleyball Cup
Pan-American
2017 in Canadian sports
International volleyball competitions hosted by Canada
July 2017 sports events in Canada
Sport in Gatineau
2017 in Quebec